James Harold Poxton (2 February 1903 – 14 December 1971) was an English professional footballer of the 1920s and 1930s. Born in Staveley, he joined Gillingham from West Bromwich Albion in 1928 and went on to make 43 appearances for the club in The Football League. He left to join Millwall in 1929. He subsequently played for Watford – predominantly at outside left – and Walsall.

References

1903 births
1971 deaths
English footballers
Gillingham F.C. players
West Bromwich Albion F.C. players
Millwall F.C. players
Watford F.C. players
Walsall F.C. players
English Football League players
People from Staveley, Derbyshire
Footballers from Derbyshire
Association football forwards